Telicota is a genus of grass skipper butterflies in the family Hesperiidae. It is a tropical Asian genus, shared between the Indomalayan realm and the Australasian realm, and ranging from Sri Lanka to Australia and New Guinea. Larval foodplants include Palmae and Gramineae - Miscanthus sinensis, Pennisetum purpureum, Oryza sativa (rice), Saccharum officinarum (sugar cane), Imperata cylindrica (lalang grass), Cocos nucifera (coconut) and Calamus (rattan).

Species
Telicota ancilla (Herrich-Schäffer, 1869)
Telicota angiana Evans, 1934
Telicota anisodesma Lower, 1911
Telicota aroa Evans, 1934
Telicota augias (Linnaeus, 1763)
Telicota bambusae (Moore, 1878)
Telicota besta Evans, 1949
Telicota brachydesma Lower, 1908
Telicota brandti Parsons, 1986
Telicota bulwa Parsons, 1986
Telicota colon (Fabricius, 1775)
Telicota doba Evans, 1949
Telicota eurotas (C. Felder, 1860)
Telicota eurychlora Lower, 1908
Telicota gervasa Evans, 1949
Telicota hilda Eliot, 1959
Telicota kaimana Evans, 1934
Telicota kezia Evans, 1949
Telicota laruta Evans, 1934
Telicota linna Evans, 1949
Telicota melanion (Mabille, 1878)
Telicota mesoptis Lower, 1911
Telicota mimena Parsons, 1986
Telicota ohara (Plötz, 1883)
Telicota paceka Fruhstorfer, 1911
Telicota sadra Evans, 1949
Telicota sadrella Parsons, 1986
Telicota subha Fruhstorfer, 1911
Telicota ternatensis Swinhoe, 1907
Telicota torsa Evans, 1934
Telicota vinta Evans, 1949

External links
Telicota at funet
Images representing Telicota at Bold

References
Natural History Museum Lepidoptera genus database

Taractrocerini
Hesperiidae genera